The Aldobrandini Madonna (also known as The Virgin and Child with the Infant Saint John and a Female Saint or Donor or The Virgin and Child with the Infant Saint John and Saint Catherine) is an oil painting on canvas by Titian, dating to around 1530 and now in the National Gallery, London. There are studio copies in the Galleria Palatina in Florence and in the Kunsthistorisches Museum in Vienna.

Frizzoni proposed identifying this Madonna with the one mentioned in 1532 by Marcantonio Michiel in the Venetian house of Andrea Odoni (subject of a portrait by Lotto), while Tietze thought it was one of three paintings commissioned from Titian by Federico Gonzaga in 1530. It was in the sacristy of the Escorial Monastery before coming to Paris in the 19th century. It then passed through the Beaucousin and Coesvelt collections before being purchased by its present owner in 1860.

Bibliography 
 Francesco Valcanover, L'opera completa di Tiziano, Rizzoli, Milano 1969.
 Marion Kaminski, Tiziano, Könemann, Colonia 2000. 
 Nao Egokoro

External links
http://www.nationalgallery.org.uk/paintings/titian-the-aldobrandini-madonna

Paintings of the Madonna and Child by Titian
1530 paintings
Paintings by Titian in the National Gallery, London